The Petersen House is a U.S. National Historic Site in Washington, D.C.

Petersen House may also refer to:

 Petersen House (Sweden), Gamla stan
in the United States
(by state, then city)

 Niels Petersen House, Tempe, Arizona, listed on the National Register of Historic Places (NRHP)
 Lambrite-Iles-Petersen, Davenport, Iowa, a U.S. Historic district contributing property
 Max Petersen House, Davenport, Iowa, NRHP-listed
 Thuesen-Petersen House, Scipio, Utah, listed on the NRHP in Millard County, Utah
 H. S. Petersen House, Port Townsend, Washington, listed on the NRHP in Jefferson County, Washington

See also
 Peterson House (disambiguation)